Gennady Udalov (1931–1996) was a diver from Russia. He competed in the 3 m springboard at the 1952 and 1956 Summer Olympics and finished in 13th place and 5th place, respectively. He won a silver medal in this discipline at the 1954 European Aquatics Championships.

References

1931 births
1996 deaths
Olympic divers of the Soviet Union
Divers at the 1952 Summer Olympics
Divers at the 1956 Summer Olympics
Soviet male divers